Joshua Benoliel (13 January 1873 – 3 February 1932) was a Portuguese photojournalist. He was the official photographer for King Carlos I of Portugal.

Biography 
Joshua Benoliel was born in Lisbon, to Judah Benoliel, a Gibraltar-born Jewish trader, and Esther Levy.

Career 
He started working as a photojournalist for sports magazine Tiro e Sport, but most of his career was in the Portuguese newspaper O Século and its supplement Ilustração Portuguesa. He was also the Portuguese correspondent of Spanish newspaper ABC and French magazine L'Illustration. Benoliel covered the main events in Portuguese history during the early decades of the 20th century, including the downfall of monarchy and the Portuguese participation in World War I. He was known for his versatility, reporting on about everything, from society parties to common street scenes.

1873 births
1932 deaths
Portuguese Jews
Portuguese photographers
World War I photographers
Portuguese monarchists
People from Lisbon